John Callahan (born September 15, 1962) is an American cross-country skier. He competed in the men's 30 kilometre classical event at the 1992 Winter Olympics. In 2003, he was the leader of an expedition to Mount Everest, appearing in the documentary film Skiing Everest.

References

External links
 

1962 births
Living people
American male cross-country skiers
Olympic cross-country skiers of the United States
Cross-country skiers at the 1992 Winter Olympics
Sportspeople from Los Angeles